The 25th Australian Film Institute Awards (generally known as the AFI Awards) were held at the Sydney Entertainment Centre on 24 September 1983.  Presented by the Australian Film Institute (AFI), the awards celebrated the best in Australian feature film, documentary and short film productions of 1983.

Twenty feature films were entered. Careful, He Might Hear You received eight awards including Best Film. Phar Lap received three awards. Film technician Bill Gooley received the Raymond Longford Award for lifetime achievement.

Winners and nominees
Winners are listed first and highlighted in boldface.

Feature film

Non-feature film

Additional awards

References

External links
 The Australian Film Institute | Australian Academy of Cinema and Television Arts official website

AACTA Awards ceremonies
AACTA Awards
1983 in Australian cinema